Mala Roy (née Sarkar; born 19 November 1957)  is an Indian politician who has been a Member of Lok Sabha for Kolkata Dakshin since 2019. She is a member of All India Trinamool Congress party. She has been the Chairperson of Kolkata Municipal Corporation since 2015.

Personal life
Roy was graduated from Calcutta University in 1976. She is married to Nirbed Ray, who is the vice president and a former MLA of the Trinamool Congress party.

Political career
In 1995, Roy was elected to the Kolkata Municipal Corporation as a councillor from ward no.88. She contested as a candidate of Indian National Congress party and defeated her nearest rival by a margin of 576 votes. In 2000, she contested as a candidate of Trinamool Congress party and retained her seat by defeating Swadeshranjan Das of the Communist Party of India (Marxist) by a margin of 3,205 votes. In 2005, she contested as a candidate of the Nationalist Congress Party and defeated Kakoli Ghosh Dastidar of Trinamool by 1,900 votes. In 2010, she was re-elected, this time as a candidate of Congress party.

Roy contested the 2014 Indian general election from Kolkata Dakshin constituency as a candidate of the Congress party. She came fourth and managed to secure 113,453 votes. On 7 March 2015, Roy who has been a fierce critic of Mamata Banerjee, rejoined her Trinamool Congress, ahead of the civic polls. After getting elected, she was made the chairperson of the municipal corporation. She became the first woman chairperson of the corporation. During her tenure as ward councillor, she turned the ward no.88 into the greenest ward of the city.

On 12 March 2019, party chairperson Mamata Banerjee announced that Roy would contest the upcoming general election from Kolkata Dakshin constituency after the sitting MP Subrata Bakshi refused to contest as he was interested in strengthening the party's organization. On 23 May, she was elected to the Lok Sabha after defeating Chandra Kumar Bose of the Bharatiya Janata Party, her nearest rival by a margin of approximately 155,192 votes. She was polled 573,119 votes compared to Bose's 417,927.

References

External links
 Official biographical sketch in Parliament of India website

India MPs 2019–present
Lok Sabha members from West Bengal
Living people
Trinamool Congress politicians from West Bengal
Politicians from Kolkata
1957 births
Indian National Congress politicians
Nationalist Congress Party politicians
West Bengal politicians
Women in West Bengal politics
Women members of the Lok Sabha
21st-century Indian politicians
21st-century Indian women politicians